The women's 100 metre butterfly event at the 2010 Asian Games took place on 13 November 2010 at Guangzhou Aoti Aquatics Centre.

There were 15 competitors from 10 countries who took part in this event. Two heats were held, the heat in which a swimmer competed did not formally matter for advancement, as the swimmers with the top eight times from the both field qualified for the finals.

Jiao Liuyang from China won the gold medal, Tao Li from Singapore won the silver medal, Japanese swimmer Yuka Kato finished with third place.

Schedule
All times are China Standard Time (UTC+08:00)

Records

Results

Heats

Final

References

 16th Asian Games Results

External links 
 Women's 100m Butterfly Heats Official Website
 Women's 100m Butterfly Ev.No.3 Final Official Website

Swimming at the 2010 Asian Games